In the automotive industry, a gull-wing door, also known as a falcon-wing door or an up-door, is a car door that is hinged at the roof rather than the side, as pioneered by Mercedes-Benz 300 SL, first as a race car in 1952 (W194), and then as a production sports car in 1954.

Opening upwards, the doors evoke the image of a seagull's wings. The papillon door was designed by Jean Bugatti for the 1939 Type 64, 14 years before Mercedes-Benz produced its similar, famous 300 SL gullwing door. The papillon door is a precursor to the gullwing door, and is slightly different in its architecture, but is often overlooked when discussing gull-wing design. Conventional car doors are typically hinged at the front-facing edge of the door, with the door swinging outward horizontally.

Apart from the Mercedes-Benz 300 SL of the mid-1950s, Mercedes-Benz SLS and the experimental Mercedes-Benz C111 of the early 1970s, the best-known examples of road-cars with gull-wing doors are the Bricklin SV-1 from the 1970s, the DMC DeLorean from the 1980s, and the Tesla Model X of the 2010s. Gull-wing doors have also been used in aircraft designs, such as the four-seat single-engine Socata TB series built in France.

Practical considerations 
The design is a very practical one in a tight urban parking space. When properly designed and counterbalanced, they require little side-clearance to open (about 27.5 cm, or 11" in the DeLorean and allow much better entrance/egress than conventional doors. The most obvious downside to having gull-wing doors is that, were the car to roll over and come to rest on its roof, exit by the doors would be impossible, requiring a large windscreen opening to escape. The Mercedes SLS solved this problem by fitting explosive bolts in the hinges, that would blow up if the car rolled over.

The Volvo YCC, a concept car designed by and for women, had gull-wing doors as part of its design. Gull-wing doors make it easier to lift a bag to store it behind the driver's seat, increase visibility over the driver's shoulder, and make it easier to get in and out of the car.

The Tesla Model X, first introduced in 2015, has double-hinged gull-wing doors, called falcon-wing doors by Tesla. The Model X has several design considerations to make the doors more practical. Being double-hinged allows them to open with less clearance (horizontal and vertical) than would otherwise be required. The vehicle also has sensors to determine ceiling height and the presence of potential obstacles and to determine how the hinges will operate to open the doors and avoid obstacles, if possible.

Design challenges 
Gull-wing doors have a somewhat questionable reputation because of early examples like the Mercedes and the Bricklin. The 300 SL needed the door design, as its tubular frame race car chassis design had a very high door sill, which in combination with a low roof would make a standard door opening very low and small. The Mercedes engineers solved the problem by also opening a part of the roof. The Bricklin was a more conventionally sized door but the actuation system was problematic in day-to-day use and led to unreliable operation until an aftermarket air-door upgrade was installed in all Bricklins. In addition, there was some concern that in making the doors as light as possible they wouldn't provide adequate protection in side-impact accidents. There was, however, no indication that this concern was justified. 

The DeLorean solved these problems by using a patented cryogenically-set stainless steel torsion bar spring (manufactured by Grumman Aircraft Engineering Corporation) to partially counterbalance a full-sized door, and then added a gas-pressurized (pneumatic) strut similar to those found in hatchback cars. The combination of the torsion spring and strut provided the correct torque variation necessary to offset the variable torque of the door, as it opened through a rotational angle of about 80 degrees. The torsion bar is most important in the first foot of movement from the bottom, where the geometry of the strut is pointed at the hinge and therefore at a mechanical disadvantage. As the spring relaxes through the door's rotation open, the strut gains a better moment arm and gradually takes over the effort. A correctly balanced door opens fully on its own by simply activating the door latch from the interior, exterior, or from an aftermarket wireless release. 

Other disadvantages of the system were not so easy to address. For example, the gull-wing design makes creating a convertible version of the car harder, as the hinges would be removed with the roof, and standard doors would be needed for the convertible. Mercedes did so when replacing the gullwing coupe altogether with the 300SL roadster in 1958. It was never a concern for DeLorean, since no convertible version was ever planned.

It also makes sealing the car against water leaks and snow intrusion more difficult because of the shape and movement path of the door itself.

List of automobiles 
The following is a (partial) list of production and kit automobiles with gull-wing doors:

Production cars 

 Aston Martin Valkyrie 
 Autozam AZ-1 (Suzuki Cara)
 Bricklin SV-1
 Bristol Fighter
 DMC DeLorean
 De Tomaso Mangusta (engine compartment)
 Gumpert Apollo
 Hofstetter Turbo
 Isdera Commendatore 112i
 Melkus RS 1000
 Melkus RS 2000
 Mercedes-Benz 300SL
 Mercedes-Benz SLS AMG
 Pagani Huayra
 Porsche 906
 (NSU) Thurner RS
 Tesla Model X (rear passenger doors only)
 HiPhi X (part of the rear passenger doors only)
 Quant E
 Quant F
 Bugatti Atlantic Type 64

Kit cars 
Gullwing doors are common in kit cars and many were made that are not included on this list. They were almost always one of the most mechanically problematic parts of these vehicles.

 AMT Piranha
 Bradley GTII
 Dare DZ
 Eagle SS Mk1
 Elite Enterprises Laser 917, inspired by the Porsche 917
 Embeesea Charger
 Fiberfab Aztec 7, an American replica of the Italian Alfa Romeo Carabo concept car.
 Fiberfab Caribee/Banshee
 Innes Lee Scorpion K19
 Pelland Sports
 Replicar Cursor
 RPB GT
 Burton Car Company hardtop
 Siva S160 Spyder

Aircraft 
 Cessna 350
 Diamond DA62
 Socata TB
 Beriev Be-103
 Stoddard-Hamilton Glasair II
 Dornier Seastar

See also 

 Butterfly doors
 Canopy door
 Car door
 List of cars with non-standard door designs
 Scissor doors
 Sliding doors
 Suicide doors
 Swan doors

References

External links 
 

 
Car doors